Louis Selwyn is an English actor and film producer. He portrayed Martin Downes, the only child of Bet Lynch who, it is implied, is connected to current Coronation Street storylines concerning Laura Neelan. He is known for his early roles in the BBC's The Three Musketeers and on stage at The Royal Shakespeare Company, as well as later appearances in the series The Strauss Family as Josef Strauss, and later as Jofre Borgia in The Borgias, both for the BBC. He went on to play Mick Jagger in Let the Good Stones Roll with Sara Coward at the Ambassadors Theatre in the West End and on to roles at The Royal National Theatre's Olivier Theatre. He released a record, Bind Your Love in Heaven, in 2001 on his own label Quantum Records. Louis has since been credited as a Producer on four feature-length films including Evil Never Dies in which he also starred as 'Gordon'. He stars in an upcoming Hitchcockian thriller/comedy/horror Heckle, due for release in 2021.

Stage 
Louis Selwyn began his stage work, as a child actor, with the Royal Shakespeare Company in 1966 in a production of Henry V, Part 2 alongside Malcolm McDowell, Sir Patrick Stewart OBE, Sir Ian Holm CBE and Frances de la Tour. He was known to the cast and crew as 'Little Louis'. He went on to take another part immediately after the show closed, again at the RSC, but this time on Twelfth Night alongside Dame Diana Rigg under the directorship of Clifford Williams.

In his early twenties, Selwyn appeared in the West End at the Ambassadors Theatre as Mick Jagger in a production of Rayner Bourton's Let The Good Stones Roll.

1979 saw Selwyn drawn to The Royal National Theatre, appearing at The Olivier Theatre on four separate productions. He played William in As You Like It, directed by John Dexter, alongside Dermot Crowley and Oz Clarke, followed by a role as Messenger in Richard III alongside Michael Beint and Mary Wimbush and directed by Christopher Morahan. The next production that year was Amadeus, appearing alongside Felicity Kendal and Simon Callow and directed by Peter Hall. The final production at The Olivier Theatre in December of 1979 was Henrik Ibsen's The Wild Duck alongside Sir Ralph Richardson.

Television 
Selwyn began his television career, as a child actor, in 1967 playing the young King Louis in 13 episodes of the series The Further Adventure of the Musketeers for the BBC, followed by further BBC parts that year on Not in front of the children, Merry Go Round and A Hundred Years of Humphrey Hastings.  In 1968 Selwyn played Roger Perry in a two-part story on Season 6 of the Z Cars series. 

In 1969 he again took a role with the BBC in The First Lady with Thora Hird, followed by an appearance on ITV's Sunday Night Theatre and later, in 1970, on ITV's Sunday Night Drama.

The Strauss Family, in 1972, saw Louis play Josef Strauss in three episodes of the TV miniseries alongside Barbara Ferris and Jane Seymour.

Selwyn played Jabir in QB VII, a 1974 mini-series starring Sir Anthony Hopkins, Leslie Caron and Anthony Quayle. The series was considered a television milestone, dealing with difficult subjects surrounding World War Two, it was based on the book by Leon Uris. This same year, Louis played Martin Downdes, the son of Bet Lynch whom she gave up for adoption, in Coronation Street. He would appear twice before the character was tragically killed, never having introduced himself to his mother.

In 1978 he played a hijacker in the series Life at Stake for the BBC, after which he played Jofre Borgia in the BBC TV mini series The Borgias. He later played a small part in Tender is the Night, Dennis Potter's BBC adaptation of the F.Scott Fitzgerald novel of the same name, starring Timothy West.

Film 
In 1960 Louis played an Apprentice in Cry of the Banshee with Vincent Price and Michael Elphick. It was a British horror film released by American International Pictures and directed by Gordon Hessler. Terry Gilliam is credited with producing the original animated title sequence.

Caught Looking was a 1991 short film starring Louis as the "voyeur", alongside iconic actor and activist Bette Bourne as narrator. It won the Teddy award for Best Short Film at Berlin International Film Festival. 

Leo Asemota's Palindrome r.s.s.r, released in 2002, was billed as a cinematic installation examining the issues of race, sex and religion. Louis played Simon Peter. 

Selwyn played "Gordon" in the horror/thriller film Evil Never Dies, alongside Tony Scannell, in 2014. Louis is credited as Producer on the movie. Continuing in the genre, he later played Charles on Blue Moon, also directed by Martyn Pick, on which Louis is also credited as Producer. It was screened at Grauman's Chinese Theatre in Hollywood as part of Screamfest. Originally for release in 2019, Louis Selwyn has most recently featured in the comedy/horror Heckle, starring Steve Guttenberg, Clark Gable III and Toyah Willcox, this movie features in the 2020 Frightfest Digital Festival. Louis is also credited as Producer on Heckle.

References

External links 
 

Living people
Year of birth missing (living people)
Royal National Theatre
Royal Shakespeare Company members
English male film actors
English male stage actors